Weissenburg Abbey may refer to:

 Weissenburg Abbey, Alsace, a former German Benedictine monastery in Alsace, France
 Weissenburg Abbey, Bavaria, a former Carmelite monastery in Bavaria, Germany